Type X (XB) U-boats were a special type of German submarine (U-boat). Although intended as long-range mine-layers, they were later used as long-range cargo transports, a task they shared with the Type IXD and Italian Romolo-class submarines.

History
The Type X was originally designed specifically to accommodate the newly developed Schachtmine A (SMA) moored mine. The initial design provided dry storage for the mines, which needed their detonators to be individually adjusted before launch; this submarine was projected to have displaced up to 2,500 tonnes. A further variant, the Type XA was projected, which would have supplemented the main mine chamber with extra mine shafts in the saddle tanks. Neither type entered production.

A total of eight Type XB boats were produced, which replaced the mine chamber of the projected Type XA with six vertical wet storage shafts in the forward section of the hull. Up to 18 mines could be carried in these shafts, with an additional 48 mines in a series of 12 shafts set into the saddle tanks on each side. They only had two torpedo tubes, both at the stern. When used as cargo-carrying submarines they carried freight containers in the mine shafts (or had the freight containers welded on top of the lateral shafts, preventing their use for mines).

The first Type XB was launched in May 1941. At 2,710 tonnes submerged and fully loaded, they were the largest German U-boats ever built, and they had to sacrifice diving speed and agility.

Service history
Six of the eight boats built were sunk during the war (four with all hands) but two survived World War II.

Following Germany's surrender, U-219 was seized by the Japanese at Batavia on 8 May 1945 and on 15 July 1945 was placed into service with the Imperial Japanese Navy as I-505.

List of Type X submarines 
There were eight Type X submarines commissioned.

Losses
Six Type XBs were lost to various causes.
  was last heard of on 6 October 1942 in the North Atlantic and was presumed sunk.
Sixteen crew survived.
There were 29 survivors.

References

Bibliography

External links 

 
Submarine classes
World War II submarines of Germany
German Type 010